Iefan ab Owain Gwynedd was a son of Owain Gwynedd (the king of Gwynedd between 1137–1170) and his second wife Cristina ferch Gronw. He had a daughter named Gwenllian.

Welsh royalty
Year of birth missing
Year of death missing
Welsh people of Irish descent
12th-century Welsh people